Cobitis meridionalis is a species of ray-finned fish in the family Cobitidae. It is found in Albania, Greece, and North Macedonia.

Its natural habitat is freshwater lakes. It is threatened by habitat loss.

References

Cobitis
Freshwater fish of Europe
Fish described in 1924
Taxa named by Stanko Karaman
Taxonomy articles created by Polbot